According to a 2009 Pew Research Center report, there are an estimated 2,000 Muslims living in Liechtenstein, approximately 4.8% of the general population (based on a census from the year 2000). In the census of 2010, 5.4% of the population (1960 persons) were Muslims; the number rose to 5.9% in the 2015 census. According to Pew Research, this number is projected to remain constant through 2030.

The great majority of Muslims in Liechtenstein are Sunni, and are predominantly from Turkey, Kosovo, Bosnia and Herzegovina, and North Macedonia.  The census reports do not state what proportion of the Muslim population hold Liechtenstein citizenship.

In 2006, the government made a contribution of US$20,000 (25,000 Swiss francs) to the Muslim community.

Since 2001, the government has granted the Muslim community a residency permit for one imam, plus one short-term residency permit for an additional imam during Ramadan. The government follows a policy of routinely granting visas to the imams in exchange for the agreement of both the Turkish Association and the Islamic community to prevent religious diatribes by the imams or the spread of religious extremism.

See also
 Islam
 Turks in Liechtenstein

References

External links
 Liechtenstein in figures 2018
 Yearbook of Muslims in Europe

Liechtenstein
Liechtenstein
Religion in Liechtenstein